Nader Hashim is an American politician. He was a member of the Vermont House of Representatives representing the Windham-4 District from 2019 to 2021.

References

Vermont politicians
Members of the Vermont House of Representatives
Living people
Year of birth missing (living people)
Place of birth missing (living people)
21st-century American politicians